As the General Elections  held on 15 June 1991 resulted in victory of AIADMK, the Governor appointed J. Jayalalithaa as Chief  Minister to head  the new Government with effect from 24 June 1991. The Governor on the advice of  the Chief Minister appointed 17 more Ministers on the same  day.

Cabinet ministers

References 

All India Anna Dravida Munnetra Kazhagam
1991 in Indian politics
J
1990s in Tamil Nadu
1991 establishments in Tamil Nadu
1996 disestablishments in India
Cabinets established in 1991
Cabinets disestablished in 1996